This is a list of Town Halls in Sydney, Australia, with local municipality listed after it. Its main town hall is the Sydney City Hall.

 Alexandria
 Annandale
 Balmain 
 Botany
 Darlington
 Erskineville
 Glebe
 Granville
 Hornsby
 Hunters Hill
 Leichhardt
 Manly
 Marrickville
 Newtown
 North Sydney
 Paddington
 Parramatta
 Petersham
 Randwick
 Redfern
 Rockdale
 Ryde
 Sydney Town
 Warringah
 Waterloo
 Willoughby
 Woollahra

See also
List of Sydney suburbs
Local government areas of New South Wales

References

Town Halls in Sydney
Sydney-related lists
Local government-related lists